David Kudler (born 1962) is an American editor and author. He is best known for editing numerous posthumous editions of the books by Joseph Campbell, including Pathways to Bliss and the 2008 edition of The Hero with a Thousand Faces.

For the Joseph Campbell Foundation, he served as the managing editor of the Collected Works of Joseph Campbell series for over twenty years. In 2012, he started Stillpoint Digital Press, producing print, ebook and audiobook editions. He has contribute to Huffington Post, Medium, and a number of other websites, writing mostly about books and publishing.

His young adult historical adventure novel Risuko was published in June, 2016. Bright Eyes, the second book in the Seasons of the Sword tetralogy, came out on May 5, 2022. He's said that he's working to complete Kano, the next book in the series, by March, 2024.

Kudler is also a stage actor who has appeared with American Conservatory Theater, Denver Center Theatre Company, California Shakespeare Theater, Marin Theatre Company, A Traveling Jewish Theater, and Theatreworks (Silicon Valley).

Bibliography

By David Kudler
The Seven Gods of Luck, illustrated by Linda Finch, Houghton Mifflin, 1998. . 15th Anniversary Edition, Stillpoint Digital Press, 2012. 
Shlomo Travels to Warsaw with Maura Vaughn, Stillpoint Digital Press, 2013. 
How Raven Brought Back the Light with Maura Vaughn, Stillpoint Digital Press, 2014. 
Inside the Box: An Introduction to ePub, HTML & CSS for the Independent Author/Publisher, Stillpoint Digital Press,  
Risuko: A Kunoichi Tale , Stillpoint Digital Press, 2016. 
Bright Eyes: A Kunoichi Tale, Stillpoint Digital Press, 2022 
Kano: A Kunoichi Tale, Stillpoint Digital Press, announced 2024

Edited by David Kudler
Joseph Campbell, Sake and Satori: Asian Journals—Japan, New World Library, 2002. 
Joseph Campbell, Myths of Light: Eastern Metaphors of the Eternal, New World Library, 2003. 
Joseph Campbell, Pathways to Bliss: Mythology and Personal Transformation, New World Library, 2005. 
Joseph Campbell, The Hero with a Thousand Faces, New World Library, 2008. 
Maura Vaughn, The Anatomy of a Choice: An Actor's Guide to Text Analysis, University Press of America, 2010. 
Jack Beritzhoff, Sail Away: Journeys of a Merchant Seaman, Stillpoint Digital Press, 2012. 
Joseph Campbell, Mythic Imagination: Collected Short Fiction, New World Library, 2012. 
Kenneth Schneyer, The Law & the Heart: Speculative Stories to Bend the Mind and Soul, Stillpoint Digital Press, 2014. 
Lynn Arias Bornstein, Laura English, Stillpoint Digital Press, 2014. 
Joseph Campbell, Asian Journals: India & Japan, New World Library, 2017. 
Heather Albano, Timepiece, Stillpoint Digital Press, 2017. 
Heather Albano, Timekeeper, Stillpoint Digital Press, 2017. 
Heather Albano, Timebound, Stillpoint Digital Press, 2017. 
Cady West, Darcy & Desire, Stillpoint Digital Press, 2021.

See also
 Jacqueline Kudler

References

American editors
American male writers
1962 births
Living people